Moving On is the second studio album by English boy band 911. Released in the United Kingdom through Virgin Records on 6 July 1998, it peaked at number 10 on the UK Albums Chart. All three singles from the album were top 10 hits in the UK.

Track listing

Notes
 signifies an assistant producer
 signifies a remixer

Credits and personnel
(Credits taken from AllMusic and Moving Ons liner notes.)

 Tracy Ackerman - vocals (background)
 Lee Brennan - vocals, composer
 Andy Caine - guitar
 Chris Cameron - string arrangements
 Dave Clews - keyboards
 Jimmy Constable - vocals
 Ian Curnow - keyboards, producer
 Spike Dawbarn - vocals
 Johnny Douglas - drums, keyboards, producer, remixing
 Paul Gendler - guitar
 David Grant - choir arrangement
 Ian Green - mixing, producer
 Phil Harding - drums, producer
 David James - arranger, keyboards, producer
 Eliot Kennedy - composer, producer
 Andy Kowalski - mixing engineer
 Tim Lever - producer
 John McLaughlin - composer
 Steve McNichol - engineer
 Andrew Murray - piano
 Mike Percy - producer
 Chris Porter - mixing, producer
 Alan Ross - guitar
 Ren Swan - programming
 Philip Todd - saxophone
 Dave Willis - cover photo
 Paul Wright - engineer

Charts and certifications

Charts

Certifications

References 

1998 albums
911 (English group) albums
Virgin Records albums